In enzymology and molecular biology, a holo-[acyl-carrier-protein] synthase (ACPS) is an enzyme that catalyzes the chemical reaction:

CoA-[4'-phosphopantetheine] + apo-acyl carrier protein  adenosine 3',5'-bisphosphate + holo-acyl carrier protein

This enzyme belongs to the family of transferases, specifically those transferring non-standard substituted phosphate groups. It is also known as 4'-phosphopantetheinyl transferase after the group it transfers.

Function 
All ACPS enzymes known so far are evolutionally related to each other in a single superfamily of proteins. It transfers a 4'-phosphopantetheine (4'-PP) moiety from coenzyme A (CoA) to an invariant serine in an acyl carrier protein (ACP), a small protein responsible for acyl group activation in fatty acid biosynthesis. This post-translational modification renders holo-ACP capable of acyl group activation via thioesterification of the cysteamine thiol of 4'-PP. This superfamily consists of two subtypes: the trimeric ACPS type such as E. coli ACPS and the monomeric Sfp (PCP-synthesizing) type such as B. subtilis SFP. Structures from both families are now known. The active site accommodates a magnesium ion. The most highly conserved regions of the protein are involved in binding the magnesium ion.

Nomenclature 
The systematic name of this enzyme class is CoA-[4'-phosphopantetheine]:apo-[acyl-carrier-protein] 4'-pantetheinephosphotransferase. Other names in common use, disregarding the synthetase/synthase spelling difference, include acyl carrier protein holoprotein synthetase, holo-ACP synthetase, coenzyme A:fatty acid synthetase apoenzyme 4'-phosphopantetheine, acyl carrier protein synthetase (ACPS), PPTase, acyl carrier protein synthase, P-pant transferase, and CoA:apo-[acyl-carrier-protein] pantetheinephosphotransferase.

Structural studies

References

Further reading 

 
 
 
 
 
 

EC 2.7.8
Enzymes of known structure
Protein families